Castrocontrigo is a municipality located in the province of León, Castile and León, Spain, 80 km from the province capital. According to the 2010 census (INE), the municipality has a population of 917 inhabitants, including the smaller village of Nogarejas.

References

Municipalities in the Province of León
Tierra de La Bañeza